Joseph Bach (born in 1872 in Urmatt) was a French clergyman and bishop for the Roman Catholic Diocese of Tarawa and Nauru. He was appointed bishop in 1927. He died in 1943.

References 

1872 births
1943 deaths
French Roman Catholic bishops
Roman Catholic bishops of Tarawa and Nauru